Nenthead in the county of Cumbria is one of England's highest villages, at around . It was not built until the middle of the 18th century and was one of the earliest purpose-built industrial villages in Britain.

History
Nenthead was a major centre for lead and silver mining in the North Pennines of Britain. The first smelt mill was built at Nenthead in 1737 by George Liddle, and this was subsequently expanded by the London Lead Company. By 1882 the smelt mill was capable of smelting 8,000 bings, i.e., of ore per annum.

Nenthead village in 1861 had 2,000 people, mostly Methodist and employed by the Quaker-owned London Lead Company in the Nenthead Mines - some of the most productive in the country. The Quakers built housing, a school, a reading room, public baths and a wash-house for the miners and their families.

Nenthead has accessible mines remaining, horse whims and a  engine shaft in Rampghill. The mines closed in 1961 and there is a heritage centre displaying their history.

The economy of the village relies on tourism. A long distance cycle route, the C2C, passes through Nenthead. The Grade 2 listed Wesleyan Methodist chapel has not been used since 2002 but benefitted from a Heritage Lottery Grant of £134,500. The post office and community shop occupies the building which was once a reading room for the miners.

County Council subsidies have maintained limited bus services to Alston and beyond. However, in 2014 cuts to these subsidies were being discussed, threatening the existence of bus services for the village.

Governance
Nenthead is in the parliamentary constituency of Penrith and The Border. Neil Hudson (Conservative) was elected as Member of Parliament at the 2019 General Election, replacing Rory Stewart.

For Local Government purposes it is in the Alston Moor Ward of Eden District Council and the Alston and East Fellside Division of Cumbria County Council. Nenthead does not have its own parish council, instead it is part of Alston Moor Parish Council.

Before Brexit, its residents were covered by the North West England European Parliamentary Constituency.

Zinc deposits
Although test drilling could go on for several years, the company believes that the village may be sited on huge deposits of the chemical element.

Climate 
With a northernly latitude of 55° N and altitude of  Amsl, Nenthead has one of the coldest and snowiest climates in England, yielding a borderline subpolar oceanic climate (Cfc) and cool oceanic climate (Cfb). The average annual temperature in Nenthead is 6.5 °C; 1,095 mm of precipitation falls annually, chiefly in winter as heavy snowfall, and in autumn.

Flag

In 2014, vexillologist and heraldicist Philip Tibbetts designed a flag for the village. The flag was officially adopted and registered with the Flag Institute on 11 May 2014. The green triangle on the flag symbolises the top of the River Nent valley, from which the village gets its name. The green triangle also refers to nearby Knowbury Hill as the eastern-most point of the historic county of Cumberland with the green shade used the same as that of the Flag of Cumberland. The eight-pointed star upon the triangle is the Star of Quakerism and refers to the origins of the village. The black and white vertical hoops depict the seams of lead and silver ore that lie beneath the area and upon which the industry of the village was based.

See also

Listed buildings in Alston Moor

References

External links

 Cumbria County History Trust: Alston Moor (nb: provisional research only – see Talk page)
 North Pennines Area of Outstanding Natural Beauty (AONB)
 Nenthead Mines

Villages in Cumbria
Eden District